Buccaneer Field House is an 881-seat multi-purpose arena in North Charleston, South Carolina. Called by many the Buc Dome, it is home to the Charleston Southern Buccaneers basketball teams.  It is the second smallest arena in Division I basketball after the G. B. Hodge Center, and is one of two arenas used by the Buccaneers.

For home games involving major conference teams or local opponents such as The Citadel or the College of Charleston, the team will play home games in the North Charleston Coliseum pending availability from South Carolina Stingrays hockey games.

See also
 List of NCAA Division I basketball arenas

External links
Charleston Southern University Fieldhouse

Buildings and structures completed in 1965
Basketball venues in South Carolina
Sports venues in Charleston, South Carolina
College basketball venues in the United States
Indoor arenas in South Carolina
Charleston Southern Buccaneers basketball